Alton Ford Jr. (May 29, 1981 – April 2, 2018) was an American professional basketball player who played in the National Basketball Association and other leagues. He last played for the NBA D-League team the Erie BayHawks.

Ford was born in Houston, Texas and attended Houston ISD Milby High School.

He was selected 51st overall in the 2001 NBA Draft by the Phoenix Suns. He played with the Phoenix Suns from 2001 to 2003, and then with the Houston Rockets in the 2003-04 NBA season. Ford played a total of 73 NBA games (64 for Phoenix and 9 for Houston) with career averages of 2.5 points and 1.7 rebounds. His final NBA game was on January 3, 2004 in a 84 - 63 win over the Utah Jazz where he played for a little under 2 minutes and recorded no stats.

He played overseas from 2004–2008.

Personal life and death
Ford and his wife, Victoria had four children.

Ford died of lymphoma, a form of blood cancer, on April 2, 2018. He was 36. His funeral was held on April 5, 2018.

References

External links
Alton Ford at NBA.com
Alton Ford at ESPN.com

1981 births
2018 deaths
African-American basketball players
American expatriate basketball people in Bosnia and Herzegovina
American expatriate basketball people in China
American expatriate basketball people in France
American expatriate basketball people in Greece
American expatriate basketball people in Poland
American men's basketball players
ASVEL Basket players
Basketball players from Houston
Centers (basketball)
Deaths from cancer in Texas
Deaths from lymphoma
Erie BayHawks (2008–2017) players
Fujian Sturgeons players
Houston Cougars men's basketball players
Houston Rockets players
JL Bourg-en-Bresse players
KK Igokea players
KK Włocławek players
P.A.O.K. BC players
Parade High School All-Americans (boys' basketball)
Phoenix Suns draft picks
Phoenix Suns players
Reno Bighorns players
Rio Grande Valley Vipers players
Xinjiang Flying Tigers players
20th-century African-American people
21st-century African-American sportspeople